This article presents a list of Universities in Tangerang and South Tangerang in Indonesia. Most of them are private university.

Public university

 Pamulang University, South Tangerang
 Syarif Hidayatullah Islamic State University Jakarta, South Tangerang
 STMIK Raharja, Cikokol, Tangerang
 Sekolah Tinggi Agama Buddha Negeri (STABN) Sriwijaya, Tangerang

Private university
 Indonesia Institute of Technology, (Institut Teknologi Indonesia - ITI) Puspitek Serpong 
 Atma Jaya Catholic University of Indonesia, BSD City
 International University Liaison Indonesia - IULI, Tangerang
 University of Muhammadiyah, Tangerang
 University of Islamic Sheikh Yusuf, Tangerang
 University of Pamulang, Tangerang
 University of Pelita Harapan, Tangerang
 Multimedia Nusantara University, Tangerang
 University of Pramita Indonesia, Tangerang
 Swiss German University, BSD City
 Prasetiya Mulya University, BSD City
 BINUS University Alam Sutera Campus
 Matana University, Gading Serpong
 Pradita University, Gading Serpong
 Bunda Mulia University, Alam Sutera
 Pembangunan Jaya University, Bintaro Jaya
 BINUS ASO School of Engineering, Alam Sutera
 Monash University, BSD Green Office Park

Universities in Banten